The Bayraktar TB2 is a medium-altitude long-endurance (MALE) unmanned combat aerial vehicle (UCAV) capable of remotely controlled or autonomous flight operations. It is manufactured by the Turkish company Baykar Makina Sanayi ve Ticaret A.Ş., primarily for the Turkish Armed Forces. The aircraft are monitored and controlled by an aircrew in a ground control station, including weapons employment. The development of the UAV has been largely credited to Selçuk Bayraktar, a former MIT graduate student.

By November 2021, the TB2 drone had completed 400,000 flight-hours globally. The largest operator of TB2 drones is the Turkish military, but an export model has been sold to the militaries of a number of other countries. Turkey has used the drone extensively in strikes on Kurdistan Workers' Party (PKK) and People's Protection Units (YPG) targets in Iraq and Syria. Bayraktar drones were later deployed by a number of other nations around the world in various wars, such as by Azerbaijan in the 2020 Nagorno-Karabakh war, by the Armed Forces of Ukraine during the 2022 Russian invasion of Ukraine, as well as by the Ethiopian National Defense Force during the Tigray War.

Development

The development of the Bayraktar TB2 had been spurred by a U.S. ban on exports of armed unmanned aircraft to Turkey due to concerns they would be used against PKK groups inside and outside Turkey.

Baykar started developing a new combat tactical aerial vehicle system at the request of the Presidency of Defense Industries, after the experiences of its first tactical UAV, the Bayraktar Çaldıran or Bayraktar TB1, delivered to the Turkish army in 2011. The Bayraktar TB2 made its maiden flight in August 2014. On 18 December 2015, a video was published of a test firing of a missile from the Bayraktar TB2, a result of a collaboration with Roketsan. Roketsan's MAM and TUBITAK-SAGE's BOZOK laser-guided bombs were tested for the first time.

Components and technologies

The aircraft previously relied on imported and regulated components and technologies such as Rotax 912 engines (manufactured in Austria) and optoelectronics (FLIR sensors imported from Wescam in Canada or Hensoldt from Germany). Bombardier Recreational Products, owner of Rotax, suspended delivery of their engines to certain countries in October 2020, after becoming aware of their military use despite being certified for civil use only.

According to British newspaper The Guardian, the arming of the Bayraktar TB2 would not have been possible without the help of the UK Hornet micro-munitions bomb rack by EDO MBM Technology Ltd. The bomb rack was provided to Turkey in 2015, and a variant of it was integrated into the aircraft by EDO MBM and Roketsan. In response to The Guardian newspaper article, Baykar Chief Technical Officer Selçuk Bayraktar denied that the bomb rack came from the UK. "We are not buying it from you, we never did. It not only does not work under any circumstances but is also very expensive", Bayraktar said on Twitter. "We have designed and manufactured a more advanced and cost-effective one ourselves."

On 19 August 2020 the UK Department for International Trade (DIT) disclosed details of a six-year history of exports of the Hornet bomb rack to Turkey between 2014 and 2020, suggesting that supply of the critical technology to Turkey had continued well beyond the development stage of the Bayraktar TB2 and right up to the publication of the Guardian story in November 2019. 18 Standard Individual Export Licence (SIEL) applications were submitted by EDO MBM Technology between 2014 and 2020 for exports of goods 'related to Hornet Bomb Racks / Hornet Missile Launchers' for end-users in Turkey. Of these; 16 of the licences were granted.

In October 2020 the use of the Canadian Wescam MX-15D system in the drone was disclosed after Armenian officials claimed that remains of a MX-15D system had been recovered from a downed TB2 drone during the nation's conflict with Azerbaijan. That triggered the stopping of MX-15D exports to Turkey while an investigation by Global Affairs Canada evaluates the use of Canadian technology in the Nagorno-Karabakh conflict. Turkish industry responded to foreign sales boycotts by announcing provision of domestically manufactured alternatives including TEI PD170 engine (manufactured by TEI), fuel valves and the CATS FLIR system (manufactured by Aselsan). Integration tests with that system started on 6 November 2020. Turkish defense industry researcher Kadir Doğan tweeted that cancellation of sales of components to Baykar by foreign companies did not pose a major problem, and that as of January 2021, all of those components have been replaced by locally manufactured alternatives.

However, the majority of Baykar's customers, including Ukraine, Poland, Morocco, and Kuwait, declined to purchase the Aselsan CATS electro-optical turret and opted to order the Wescam MX-15D through an authorized distributor.

Characteristics

Design 

The Bayraktar TB2 platform has a blended wing body design with an inverted V-tail structure. Thrust is generated by a variable pitch two-blade propeller in pusher configuration. The propeller is mounted between the tail booms and driven by an internal combustion engine located in the body. The monocoque platform is modular with detachable main items such as wing, tail boom, and V-tails. Fuselage pieces are made mostly of carbon fiber composite with machined aluminum parts at joints. Fuel is stored within bladder tanks and fuel consumption is balanced with solenoid valves.

The ground control station (GCS) is based on a NATO spec shelter unit which is equipped with cross redundant command and control systems. The mobile unit supports three personnel: pilot, payload operator and mission commander. The GCS is equipped with redundant air conditioners and nuclear, biological and chemical filtration (NBC) filtering unit. All hardware inside the shelter is placed inside racked cabinets. Each operator has dual screens in front along with the operator interface software used for real-time command, control and monitoring.

While the Turkish Armed Forces describes Bayraktar TB2 as "Tactical UAV Class" to prevent it from being a competitor to the TAI Anka UAV, international standards would classify it as a medium-altitude long-endurance UAV.

Configuration 

Each TB2 is configured with six aerial vehicle platforms, two ground control stations, three ground data terminals (GDT), two remote video terminals (RVT) and ground support equipment. Each aerial platform is equipped with a triply redundant avionics system. Its ground control system's cross redundant architecture allows for pilot, payload operator and mission commander to command, control and monitor the platform.

Digital flight control system 
The TB2 has a triple-redundant flight control system with autonomous taxi, takeoff, cruise, landing and parking capability. The computerized flight control system is the primary component, conducting sensor fusion algorithms with the real-time sensor data. Mission-specific controls are handled through the mission control computer system. The aerial platform is guided through various redundant rotary and linear servo actuators. All of the main airborne avionics equipment, software and hardware are under constant development.

The electronic power supply that powers the onboard systems is supported with triple alternators and balanced, smart lithium-ion battery units. A ruggedized heated camera unit is placed in the tail section of the platform to monitor flight and all payload and telemetry data are recorded to the airborne data recorder. The redundancy architecture of the avionics supports autonomous emergency landings on different airfields if necessary. Sensor fusion algorithms, including an inertial navigation system, allow navigation and auto landing even with loss of global positioning signals.

Price 

The price for a single TB2 unit has been estimated at 5 million US dollars, around one-sixth of the US-built Reaper UAV. Baykar has not stated a price, but has republished on its website several news reports about crowdfunding campaigns launched in 2022 in Europe to buy Bayraktar UAVs for Ukraine, all of them fixing a goal of around US$5–5.5 million for the unit.

Operational history

Turkey 

The Turkish military's use of the TB2 gained prominence in counterinsurgency operations against the Kurdistan Workers' Party (PKK) and People's Protection Units (YPG) militants positions across the border in Iraq and Syria.

On 30 June 2018, one Turkish Air Force Bayraktar TB2 crashed due to technical problems in Hatay province, Turkey.

On 15 August 2018, Turkish Land Forces successfully used Bayraktar TB2 in a joint cross-border operation of the Turkish Armed Forces and the National Intelligence Organization of Turkey to kill the senior (PKK) leader and board member of the Kurdistan Communities Union İsmail Özden in Sinjar District, northwestern Iraq.

Turkish military used combined UAV and artillery tactics in Syria against the PKK-linked YPG. According to Turkey the number of militant killed or wounded rose to 449 by use of armed TB2 and 680 were indirectly in operations assisted by air support from the UAV.

On 16 May 2021, one Bayraktar TB2 crashed in Zebari, Northern Iraq, Kurdish militants claimed they shot down the drone.

A total of 37 Turkish Bayraktar TB2 UAVs successfully flew over 1551 hours in the earthquake zone of the 2023 Turkey-Syria earthquake.The drones have been instrumental in providing continuous updates and data to the crisis response team for damage detection, search and rescue support, along with coordination activities.

Libya 
In June 2019, international news media reported that Libya's UN-recognized Government of National Accord (GNA) used Bayraktar TB2s to strike an airbase held by General Haftar's Libyan National Army (LNA). Despite the UN embargo on Libya's ongoing civil war, it is suspected that at least 3 Bayraktar TB2 UCAV were being used over Tripoli by the GNA government forces. On 6 June 2019, two GNA TB2 drones are destroyed along an operation room by LNA attacks on Mitiga Airport. Video evidence showed at least one TB2 flying over Tripoli about to land at Mitiga's Military section, under control of GNA-allied forces.

 On 14 May 2019, a GNA TB2 is destroyed by LNA defenses in Al -Jufra area.
 On 6 June 2019, two GNA TB2s are destroyed along an operation room by LNA attacks on Mitiga Airport. 
 On 30 June 2019, a TB2 is destroyed by LNA defenses.
 On 25 July 2019, two LNA Ilyushin Il-76TD cargo planes are destroyed on the ground in al-Jufra Air base by an attack made by TB2 drones. A GNA TB2 is shot down near al-Jufra airbase during the same attack.
 On 14 December 2019, a GNA TB2 is shot down in Ain Zara, Tripoli.
 On 2 January 2020, a GNA TB2 is shot down south of Mitiga Airport, Tripoli.
 On 22 January 2020, a TB2 drone, T92 with GNA markings is shot down by LNA forces after taking off from Mitiga International Airport.
 On 25 February 2020, the LNA shoot down a GNA TB2, providing a video of the wreck.
 On 26 February 2020, the LNA shoot down another GNA TB2, providing video of the wreck.
 On 31 March 2020, the LNA shot down two GNA TB2 drones near Tripoli; one in Misrata Air College and another in Al-Tawaisha.
 On 5 April 2020, a GNA TB2 is shot down by LNA forces in Alwashka, Libya.
 On 11 April 2020, a GNA TB2 is shot down in Tarhuna.
 On 13 April 2020, a GNA TB2 serial number T94 is shot down near Mitiga airport by LNA forces.
 On 16 April 2020, a GNA TB2 was shot down near Tarhuna.
 On 17 April 2020, two GNA TB2 drones are shot down; one with tail number T95 near Bani Walid and another in the South near Wadi dinar.
 On 18 April 2020, a GNA TB2 is shot down by LNA forces south of Tripoli.
 On 2 May 2020, a GNA TB2 is destroyed at Arada, near Mitiga Airport, downed by LNA forces.
 On 12 May 2020, a GNA TB2 is shot down near Ash Shwayrif, Tripoli.
 On 21 May 2020, Libyan National Army's Pantsir missile system shot down two GNA drones; one TAI Anka drone near Tarhuna city and one TB2 near Jebel Sherif.
 On 7 June 2020, a GNA TB2 was shot down by LNA forces near Sirte.
 8 June 2020, a GNA TB2 was shot down by LNA forces as it attempted to bomb LNA forces in Sirte.
 By 1 July 2020, at least 16 TB2 drones were reported shot down or lost on Libya during six months of fighting and 23 were reported lost since LNA offensive in Western Libya that began in April 2019.

Syria 

In March 2020 Bayraktar TB2s, Anka-S UAVs, and an array of Koral electronic jammers were deployed and extensively used in coordinated action to strike Syrian Army targets on the ground during the Operation Spring Shield launched by Turkey following losses the Turkish forces incurred at the hands of the Russian forces in northwestern Syria at the end of February 2020. The deployment was assessed by experts to be a success and a tactical game-changer.

During the week of fighting, Turkish drones took out 73 Syrian armed vehicles. Russian sources said that the Russian-backed Syrian air defences claimed the destruction of seven Bayraktar TB2 UAVs by 5 March 2020. However, there is only visual evidence for three Bayraktar drones being shot down.

On 23 August 2020, another Bayraktar TB2 drone was shot down by Syrian Air Defenses near Kafr Nabl, Idlib after being detected spotting targets for Syrian rebels.

On 22 October 2021, Turkey launched a surprise attack using Bayraktar TB2s on the Syrian town of Ayn al-Arab, destroying several vehicles and killing a passenger of a car, a suspected member of a Kurdish rebel group.

In 2022, Turkish drone strikes killed 50 fighters and 10 civilians.

Azerbaijan and 2020 Nagorno-Karabakh war 

In June 2020, the Defence Minister of Azerbaijan, Zakir Hasanov, announced that Azerbaijan had decided to purchase Bayraktar drones from Turkey. During the 2020 Nagorno-Karabakh war, Bayraktar TB2s were used against Armed Forces of Armenia with great success. Azerbaijan used TB2s to destroy Armenian artillery, infantry positions and military vehicles, including BM-30 Smerch MLRS, T-72 tanks, BMP-1 and BMP-2 IFVs. Nine Osa and Strela-10 air defense systems were also destroyed by Azerbaijani drones, likely TB2s.
On 19 October 2020, a Bayraktar TB2 was shot down by air defenses of the Armenian Army over Nagorno-Karabakh. On 8 November 2020, another Azerbaijani Bayraktar TB2 was shot down by air defense, in southeastern Nagorno-Karabakh.

Ukraine and 2022 Russian invasion

As a part of its military modernization program the Armed Forces of Ukraine purchased 12 Bayraktar TB2s in 2019. In January 2019, Baykar signed an agreement with Ukrspetsproject, part of Ukroboronprom, on the purchase of six TB2 and 3 ground control stations worth US$69 million for the Ukrainian army. Ukraine received the first batch of the UAVs in March 2019. After successful testing of the aircraft, the Ukrainian Navy placed a separate order for six TB2s, to be delivered in 2021, according to navy officials. Meanwhile, Turkish and Ukrainian officials announced the establishment of a joint venture to produce 48 additional Bayraktar TB2s in Ukraine. The first batch of the Bayraktar TB2 complex was delivered to the Navy in July 2021.

During a Russian military buildup in Crimea and near Ukraine's borders, a TB2 conducted a reconnaissance flight over the Donbas region on 9 April 2021. This was the first operational use of the aircraft by Ukrainian forces within an active conflict zone. In October 2021, a TB2 drone was used for the first time in combat during the war, targeting a Russian separatist artillery position, destroying a D-30 howitzer, and halting the bombardment of Ukrainian troops near Hranitne.

During the 2022 Russian invasion of Ukraine, TB2 drones have been used by Ukraine's armed forces against Russian forces and equipment. In January prior to the invasion, the spokesperson for the air force command Lt. Col. Yuri Ihnat confirmed that "Ukraine has approximately 20 Bayraktar drones, but we will not stop there". On 2 March, Ukrainian defense minister Oleksii Reznikov announced the arrival of additional TB2 drones.

According to video footage released by the armed forces, TB2 drones have successfully destroyed on different occasions a Russian command post, military vehicles including tanks, IFVs, different types of trucks, surface-to-air missile systems (including Buk and Tor), self-propelled artillery, multiple rocket launcher (MLRS), howitzers and an electronic warfare system. The drone also reportedly destroyed two Russian fuel trains, patrol boats and helicopter.

On 24 February, the day of invasion, the People's Militia of the Luhansk People's Republic claimed it shot down two TB2 drones near the city of Luhansk. On 27 February, Ukraine's air force confirmed two strikes by TB2 on Russian convoys in the Kherson and Zhytomyr regions.

The chief of Ukraine's air force Lieutenant General Mykola Oleschuk called the UAV system "life-giving". The popularity of the drone in Ukraine led to a song, "Bayraktar" being written about the drone while throwing insults at the Russian army and the invasion.

Ukrainian drones appear to be equipped with anti-jamming antenna. They appear to use MAM-C glide bombs and  MAM-L. Traditional search radars appear to struggle against the TB2 because of its slow speed and size, which give it a low radar cross section. One radar that was destroyed on 7 May appeared to be actively scanning just prior to being supposedly hit. Although this may be helped by reports of Russian units turning off their own radars to reduce their own detection. It also can be deployed within minutes and launched from a normal road.

On 26 February 2022, two TB2 drones were claimed shot down near Schastia. On 17 March 2022, a Bayraktar TB2 was shot down over Kyiv; Russia published images of the drone wreckage. A second TB2 drone was shot down on 29 March 2022, in eastern Ukraine On 2 April a third TB-2 drone was shot down.

On 13 April 2022, Ukrainian sources claimed at least two R-360 Neptune missiles were responsible for the sinking of the Russian cruiser Moskva – causing an explosion on one of the ship's exposed deckside missile tubes. Drones, likely TB2s, were alleged to have helped decoy the cruiser's defences.

On 26 and 27 April, three additional TB2 drones were destroyed, two in Kursk Oblast and the third in Belgorod Oblast, Russia by a Pantsir-S1.

On 1 May, a TB2 drone with registration S51T was shot down in Kursk region, Russia. TB2 losses amounted to seven units confirmed visually.

On 2 May, Bayraktar drones operated by Ukraine attacked and destroyed two Russian Raptor-class patrol boats near Snake Island.

On 7 May, a TB2 drone attacked and destroyed a Russian Mil Mi-8 transport helicopter as it was unloading passengers on Snake Island. In the same deployment, a TB2 drone destroyed a Tor missile launcher on the island, while a second launcher was destroyed as it was being unloaded from a landing craft. This cleared the way for a bombing run by Ukrainian Air Force Sukhoi Su-27 'Flanker' aircraft against buildings on the island.

On 23 May 2022, the remains of a Ukrainian Bayraktar TB2, tail number 75 were found in Romanian territorial waters by Romanian authorities. The drone was likely shot down during the Snake Island attacks made by Ukraine in May 2022.

On 28 May 2022 Lithuanian citizens fundraised $3.2 million, out of the $5.37 million, to buy a single Bayraktar TB2 drone for Ukraine. On 2 June, Baykar said: "The people of Lithuania have honorably raised funds to buy a Bayraktar TB2 for Ukraine. Upon learning this, Baykar will gift a Bayraktar TB2 to Lithuania free of charge and asks those funds go to Ukraine for humanitarian aid."

From the beginning of the invasion to late June, Ukraine received over 50 TB2s. On 28 June, Defence Minister Oleksii Reznikov announced that Baykar would be devoting all of its capacities to meet the needs of the Ukrainian armed forces, fulfilling its requirement for "dozens more" of the aircraft.

Vulnerability 
Although at the start of the invasion Ukrainian drones, including the TB2, were able to be used to harass Russian forces, by summer 2022 they had become less effective in this role. The disorganized Russians were initially slow to set up proper air defenses, but once they did Ukrainian UAVs were downed with increasing frequency. In addition to being shot down, electronic warfare is used to jam and disrupt communication links. This may have caused the Ukrainians to scale back TB2 use. On 25 July, a military expert said to the BBC, that the slow speed and medium altitudes of Bayraktar drones made them easy targets for Russian air defenses, and that many were shot down.

By late July a TB2 with tail number U139 was reported shot down in Belgorod Oblast, Russia. On 2 August another drone with call sign 409 was shot down in Ukraine. On 2 September 2022, the remains of a Ukrainian Bayraktar TB2 drone were discovered in Kherson. 

By July 2022, Bayraktar TB2 losses reached 14 units, confirmed visually.

In July 2022 Haluk Bayraktar, CEO of Baykar, stated in an interview that his company would never supply Russia with its drones as he supports Ukraine's sovereignty and independence.

Ethiopia and Tigray
Ethiopian forces have reportedly been using the TB2 against the TPLF in the Tigray War. Satellite images have shown TB2 drones in Harar Meda airbase, and debris of MAM-L guided munition have been found in Tigray. On 7 January 2022, a drone strike killed nearly 60 civilians and injured dozens more in a camp of internally displaced people in Dedebit in Tigray; the missile used was a MAM-L exclusively used with the TB2 drone.

African insurgencies
Some parts of Africa face attacks by highly mobile bands of Islamist militants, moving through scrubby terrain by motorbike to attack isolated military and civilian targets. This had largely been in the Sahel, but by 2019 had been spreading. Drones provide countries with aerial surveillance capacity to seek and potentially attack insurgents. Buying from Turkey reduces the dependence of Niger and Togo on former colonial power France.

Variants

Bayraktar TB2S 
In October 2020, Baykar CTO Selçuk Bayraktar showed the new, improved version of TB2, named TB2S. In Selçuk Bayraktar's Twitter post, the TB2S has a protrusion on its body and an antenna on its nose for satellite communication (SATCOM). In the basic model of TB2, communication between the aircraft and the control station was via ground-based antenna. Communication via the TÜRKSAT satellite provides a much bigger control range than the 150–300 km range of the basic model. The satellite communication will also make the TB2S more resistant to the jamming of communication by the enemy. The SATCOM-integrated TB2S made its maiden flight on 4 December 2020.

Operators

Current operators 
  [2014]
 Turkish Land Forces – >200 operational
 Turkish Naval Forces – 10 TB2s
 Gendarmerie General Command – 18 units used by Elazig Gendarmerie UAV command
 Coast Guard Command – 6 TB2s
 General Directorate of Security (Police) – Under Aviation Department. 6 TB-2s entered the inventory in 2019, another 3 TB2s entered in 2020 and 3 more in 2022.
Turkish National Intelligence Organization
   [2019]
 Reconnaissance and Surveillance Center – 6 operational.
  [2019]
Libyan Air Force
  [2019]
 Ukrainian Air Force – 6 operational and 48 more have been ordered (as of 2020). (It is unknown how many systems are still in operation.)
 Ukrainian Navy – 6 have been ordered, the first drone arrived in July 2021. Four more are intended to be purchased by the end of 2022. (It is unknown how many systems are still in operation.)
  [2020]
Azerbaijani Air Force had confirmed its use.
 [2021]
Turkmen Air Force
  [2021]
Moroccan Air Force – 19 drones have been ordered. Received first TB2 on 21 September 2021.
  [2021]
Ethiopian Air Force – 4 ordered in August 2021, delivered in November 2021.
 [2021]
State Border Guard Service – Ordered 3 units. Deliveries started.
 [2021]
Somali Air Force
   [2022]
 Pakistan Air Force – Unknown number in service. Evaluated in mid 2021, with operations starting in early 2022.
  [2022]
 Djibouti Air Force
  [2022]
 Air Force
  [2022]
 Air Force
  [2022]
 Air Force
  [2022]
 Niger Air Force – 6 units delivered as of May 2022.
 [2022]
 Air Force
  [2022]
 Polish Air Force – 24 drones were ordered in 2021, making Poland the first NATO and EU country to buy the drones. The first batch of aircraft has delivered in 2022.
 [2022]
Malian Air Force – at least three delivered.
 [2022]
United Arab Emirates Air Force – In September 2022, Reuters reported that Baykar has delivered 20 armed Bayraktar drones to the United Arab Emirates and could sell more in the future. Later in 2022 Middle East Eye reported that UAE is negotiating to buy 120 TB2 drones from Baykar with a large package of ammunition, training, and control centers in a deal worth up to 2 billion dollars. In March 2023, one TB2 drone was pictured next to UAE troops in Desert Tiger Exercise/6 military drills in Malaysia.

Future operators 
 [Unknown]
Romanian Land Forces – The Romanian Ministry of National Defence requested the purchase approval of 3 Bayraktar TB2 systems consisting of 6 drones each (18 in total). The purchased drones are intended to serve with the Land Forces. The total cost is estimated to be around $300 million including the support package.

 Iraqi Armed Forces – In an Iraqi TV broadcast, the Iraqi defense minister announced that Iraq will soon acquire TB2 drones and T129 ATAK helicopters. 8 drones have been ordered.

 Albanian Armed Forces – In December 2022, Baykar's CEO, Haluk Bayraktar, signed a contract with the Albanian prime minister, Edi Rama, to deliver 3 Bayraktar TB2s to the armed forces of Albania in the first stage with options to expand the fleet in future.

 Kuwaiti Armed Forces – Turkish drone magnate Baykar signed a $370 million (TL 6.95 billion) contract to export its Bayraktar TB2 unmanned combat aerial vehicles (UCAVs) to Kuwait.

Specifications (TB2) 

Specifications for the Bayraktar TB2 (not TB2S) from Baykar Defence.

General characteristics 
 Crew: 0 on board, 3 per ground control station
 Length: 
 Wing span: 
 Max. take-off mass: 
 Payload: 
 Powerplant: 1 ×  Rotax 912-iS internal combustion engine with injection
 Propeller: 2-bladed variable-pitch
 Fuel capacity: 
 Fuel type: gasoline (petrol)

Performance 
 Maximum speed: 
 Cruise speed: 
 Range: up to 
 Communication range: line-of-sight propagation, < 
 Service ceiling: 
 Operational altitude: 
 Endurance: 27 hours

Armaments

 Hardpoints: four hardpoints with provisions to carry combinations of:
 MAM: MAM-C and MAM-L laser-guided smart bombs
 L-UMTAS (Long Range Anti tank Missile System)
 Roketsan Cirit (70 mm Missile System)
 TUBITAK-SAGE BOZOK Laser Guided Rockets
 TUBITAK-SAGE TOGAN quad rack of GPS/INS guided 81 mm mortars
 Advanced Precision Kill Weapon System – 70mm laser-guided rocket (proposed)

Avionics
 Interchangeable EO/IR/LD imaging and targeting sensor systems or Multi Mode AESA Radar:
 Aselsan CATS EO/IR/LD imaging and targeting sensor (Option 1) 
 Hensoldt ARGOS-II HDT (Option 2) 
 Wescam MX-15D EO/IR/LD imaging and targeting sensor (Option 3, all production until October 2020)
 Garmin GNC 255A navigation/communication transceiver

See also

References

External links 

 Turkey breaks national record for longest drone flight
 Baykar Aerospace Industries 
 Baykar Research Activities Documentary Video
 Bayraktar Block B Technical Brochure
 Bayraktar Block B Preliminary Design Review Documentary / May 2012
 Bayraktar Block B Maiden Flight / 29 April 2014
 Bayraktar Block B Endurance Record Flight / 5–6 August 2014
 Bayraktar Block B Altitude Record Flight / 14 June 2014

2010s Turkish military aircraft
International unmanned aerial vehicles
Medium-altitude long-endurance unmanned aerial vehicles
Unmanned aerial vehicles of Turkey
Unmanned military aircraft of Turkey